The Year of the Wolf is a 2007 Finnish drama film directed by Olli Saarela.

Cast 
 Krista Kosonen - Sari Karaslahti
 Kari Heiskanen - Mikko Groman
 Johanna af Schultén - Mikaela
 Kai Vaine - Ilari
 Ville Virtanen - Leif
 Katariina Kaitue - Marjatta Jokela
 Kristiina Halttu - Sarin äiti
 Jukka Puotila - Sarin isä
 Anne-Mari Alaspää - Riikka
 Aksa Korttila - Lotta

References

External links 

2007 drama films
2007 films
Finnish drama films